Mathias Hynes (21 January 1883 – 9 March 1926) was a British tug of war competitor who competed in the 1912 Summer Olympics. In 1912 he won the silver medal as member of the British team City of London Police, though he was Irish.

References

1883 births
1926 deaths
Olympic tug of war competitors of Great Britain
Tug of war competitors at the 1912 Summer Olympics
Olympic silver medallists for Great Britain
Olympic medalists in tug of war
Medalists at the 1912 Summer Olympics